Relations between the countries of Georgia and the United States continue to be very close and encompass multiple areas of bilateral cooperation. One of the key U.S. allies in Eastern Europe, Georgia was the third largest troop contributor in the Iraq War and the largest per-capita contributor to the U.S. led mission in Afghanistan. The United States for its part is actively assisting Georgia in strengthening its state institutions in face of increasing pressure from its northern neighbor Russia and has provided the country with financial assistance in excess of 3 billion dollars since 1991. Since 2009, Georgian–American relations are streamlined by the U.S.–Georgia Charter on Strategic Partnership, which created four bilateral working groups on priority areas of democracy; defense and security; economic, trade, energy issues, people-to-people and cultural exchanges.

Since the early 2000s, Georgia has sought to become a member of NATO with U.S. support; however, Georgia's membership was delayed indefinitely, along with that of Ukraine, due to strong Russian opposition. In February 2012, it was agreed that the U.S. and Georgia will start working on a Free Trade Agreement which, if materialized, will make Georgia the only European country to have such treaty with the United States. American citizens visiting Georgia currently do not require a visa for entry. Citizens will receive a 90-day tourist visa at the country's entry points.

According to the 2012 U.S. Global Leadership Report, 51% of Georgians approve of U.S. leadership, with 15% disapproving and 34% uncertain.

Georgian-American cooperation on development
The United States works closely with Georgia to promote mutual security, counterterrorism interests and provides Georgia with bilateral security assistance, including English-language and military professional training, through the International Military Education and Training (IMET) program.

The multi-year Georgia Train and Equip Program (GTEP) ended in 2004, achieving its intended goals of enhancing Georgia's military capability and stimulating military reform. Launched in January 2005, the Georgia Sustainment and Stability Operations Program has advanced GTEP's goals and trained the Georgian contingent participating in coalition operations in Iraq. Partnership with the Georgia (U.S.) National Guard, visits by the Sixth Fleet, the Coast Guard to Georgia, and the Bilateral Working Group on Defense and Military Cooperation are also important components of American security relationship with Georgia.

Promoting democracy and reform is another strategic pillar of America's bilateral relationship with Georgia. In April 2006, as part of these reforms Georgia passed a strong anti-human trafficking law and has since then ranked consistently among Tier 1 countries of the State Department's report on trafficking in persons, meaning that the country now fully complies with the minimum standards for the elimination of trafficking.

Georgia hosts 90 Peace Corps Volunteers who work in English Language Education and NGO Development.

The Iraq War
In a sign of Georgia's increased shift away from Russia and towards the West in the early 2000s, the country committed significant number of troops to U.S.-led coalition in Iraq, after wrapping up a smaller operation in the American-led peacekeeping mission in the war-torn Balkans. Georgia's contingent in Iraq originally consisted of 300 special forces troops under U.S. command in Baqouba, who guarded two bridges and three American Forward Operating Bases. 550 more troops were deployed in June 2005, which were placed under U.S. command on a dangerous 'Middle Ring Security' mission in the Green Zone.

In 2007, Georgia brought the total number of its troops in Iraq to 2000, becoming the third largest troop contributor after the U.S. and the United Kingdom. The troops, all of whom had been trained by American instructors, were based east of Baghdad, close to the border with Iran.

During the outbreak of war between Georgia and Russia on August 8, 2008, Georgia was forced to pull its entire 2,000-strong contingent from Iraq to provide assistance back home. At the time of the withdrawal, five Georgian soldiers had died in Iraq and 19 were wounded.

War in Afghanistan

Georgia currently maintains 1600 soldiers in the U.S.-led mission in Afghanistan, making it the largest per-capita contributor in the mission and the largest non-NATO contributor to the war effort, after overtaking Australia in 2012. The country has lost 30 soldiers in Afghanistan and more than 170 were wounded since 2010. The most recent deaths occurred on May 13, 2013, when 3 Georgian soldiers: Cpl Alexander Kvitsinadze, Lower Sergeant Zviad Davitadze and Cpl Vladimer Shanava were killed after a terrorist incursion and an accompanying suicide attack on the 42nd Battalion military base.

Following the defeat of Georgia's ruling UNM Coalition in the Georgian parliamentary elections of 2012, the new governing coalition has promised the United States to remain in Afghanistan and maintain presence there even after most of the coalition withdraws in 2014. Georgia has already started training Afghan security personnel on site and in Georgia. The country also plans to deploy to the area its helicopter instructors, who possess decades of experience with Soviet helicopters, similar to the kind Afghanistan will be using in the years to come.

The virtually non-existent domestic opposition to Georgia's deployment in Afghanistan has not substantially increased despite increasing number of Georgian casualties. This is due to the fact that both U.S. and Georgian governments promote the Afghan involvement as one of the building blocks of Georgia's NATO membership, which has proved elusive in recent years due to Russian complaints

South Ossetia conflict

Much like its Western allies, the United States condemned Russia's intrusion into Georgia's sovereign territory and while it abstained from direct military action, Washington used military aircraft and naval forces to deliver aid to Georgia to signal its strong support. Following the war, at the advice of Vice President Joseph Biden the U.S. appropriated one billion dollars to help Georgia rebuild.

On January 9, 2009, the U.S. Secretary of State Condoleezza Rice and Georgian Foreign Minister Grigol Vashadze signed a Charter on Strategic Partnership, a nonbinding document outlining areas of cooperation and reiterating the U.S. support for Georgia's territorial integrity and to Georgia's NATO membership.

Following U.S. President Barack Obama's meeting with Dmitry Medvedev in 2009, there were worries in Georgia and among its supporters in the U.S. that the Georgian-American relations would suffer as a result of attempts to repair Russian–American relations. However, the White House stated that the administration will continue to support Georgia.

In February 2014, Georgian Premier Irakli Garibashvili met with U.S. Secretary of State John Kerry to discuss Georgia's future as well as recent developments in Ukraine.

In his 2020 book A Promised Land, Barack Obama post-Presidency discussed the Georgia invasion by Russia, also explaining personally that "Medvedev's rebuttal on Georgia reminded me that he was no Boy Scout" (p. 341)! President Obama argued, as is the position on Ukraine in the UN, that the invasion and continued occupation of Georgia by Russian Federation violated Georgia's sovereignty and international law. The situation is considered current in 2022.

See also

 Georgian Americans
 Foreign relations of the United States
 Foreign relations of Georgia (country)
 Bush Doctrine
 Abkhazia–United States relations
 South Ossetia–United States relations

References

External links
 History of Georgia - U.S. relations

 Background information

Bilateral relations of the United States
United States